Cadí Tunnel (Catalan and ) is a toll road tunnel in Catalonia, Spain, connecting the comarques of Cerdanya and Berguedà.

It comprises two lanes, separated by a  safety zone in the middle.

Name 
The Serra de Moixeró is often confused with the nearby Serra del Cadí range, hence the tunnel's naming after the latter. Both ranges are within the Cadí-Moixeró Natural Park, which also includes nearby Pedraforca.

References

External links

 

Berguedà
Buildings and structures in Catalonia
Cerdanya (comarca)
Pyrenees
Road tunnels in Spain
Toll tunnels in Europe
Transport in Catalonia
Tunnels completed in 1984